The Parkside Avenue station is a local station on the BMT Brighton Line of the New York City Subway. It is located at Parkside Avenue and Ocean Avenue in Flatbush, Brooklyn.  The station is served by the Q train at all times.

History 
This station was originally built sometime before 1895 by the Brooklyn and Brighton Beach Railroad as Flatbush station. Through a series of mergers and acquisitions, it was acquired by the Brooklyn Rapid Transit Company, and reopened in 1905 as a two-track station named Woodruff Avenue.

On June 20, 1917, the New York State Public Service Commission approved a resolution directing the New York Municipal Railway to construct an additional exit staircase from the proposed station's southbound platform to Ocean Avenue north of Woodruff Avenue.

This portion of the line was rebuilt from a two-track open cut to a four-track open cut in 1919.

After August 1, 1920, through service was shifted from the current BMT Franklin Avenue Line to a new subway alignment under Flatbush Avenue, which permitted direct access to Manhattan via the Manhattan Bridge and the Montague Street Tunnel.

In May 2015, the Parkside Plaza was established outside the station’s main entrance at Parkside and Ocean Avenue. The Plaza features plants, chairs, tables and umbrellas, and it serves as a local gathering space and venue for events and outdoor markets. Local residents had worked for years to create the plaza upon what had previously been a large and underused strip of sidewalk.

Station layout

This station currently has four tracks and two side platforms. The two center express tracks are used by the B train when it operates on weekdays.

The original southern two-thirds of the platforms are in a tunnel underneath cross streets and buildings, while the remaining northern one third is in an open cut. The extreme north ends of the platforms, which were extensions built in the 1960s, have no canopies and curve to the north. The southbound platform has its concrete wall painted beige while the northbound one is carved within the Earth's crust. Here, the station signs are the standard black plates in white lettering. The rest of the open cut has a concrete canopy with red columns. The remainder of the platforms in the tunnel have red columns and a red trim line and mosaic name tablets reading "PARKSIDE AVE." in gold serif font surrounded by diamonds.

The 1994 artwork here is called Brighton Clay Re-Leaf by Susan Tunick. It features ceramic tiles portraying leaves in the station house within fare control. This artwork can also be found at the Prospect Park station.

Exits

The station's main entrance/exit is a street level station house on the northern end of the tunnel above the platforms and tracks. Two staircases from each platform go up to a waiting area/crossover, where a turnstile bank provides entrance/exit from the system. Outside fare control, there is a token booth and two sets of doors, one leading to Parkside Avenue and Ocean Avenue and the other to the southern entrance of Prospect Park.

The Coney Island-bound platform has an exit-only at the extreme south end. A single platform-level turnstile leads to a short tunnel, where a staircase goes up to the southwest corner of Woodruff and Ocean Avenues. The extreme south end of the Manhattan-bound platform has an employee-only facility.

References

External links 

 
 Station Reporter — Q Train
 The Subway Nut — Parkside Avenue Pictures
 MTA's Arts For Transit — Parkside Avenue (BMT Brighton Line)
 Parkside Avenue entrance from Google Maps Street View
 Ocean Avenue exit only stair from Google Maps Street View
 Tunnel part from Google Maps Street View
 Open-cut part from Google Maps Street View

BMT Brighton Line stations
New York City Subway stations in Brooklyn
Railway stations in the United States opened in 1905
1905 establishments in New York (state)
Flatbush, Brooklyn
1919 establishments in New York City